"When Forever Has Gone" is a song by Greek singer Demis Roussos.
The song "When Forever Has Gone" was first released on the B-side of the single "With You" in 1974. Later, in 1976, "When Forever Has Gone" was released as a single itself.

The song was later included on Roussos' 1977 album The Demis Roussos Magic.

Background and writing 
The song was written by Brent Mason and Stélios Vlavianós. The recording was produced by Peter Sullivan.

Commercial performance 
The song spent two weeks at number 2 in the official UK singles chart in the second half of October 1976, number one in both weeks being Pussycat's "Mississippi".

Track listing

7" single "With Wou" (1974) 
7" single "With You" Philips 6009 543 (1974, France, Germany, Italy, Netherlands, Norway, etc.)
7" single "With You" RTB / Philips S 53804 (1974, Yugoslavia)
 A. "With You" (3:16)
 B. "When Forever Has Gone" (3:02)

7" single "When Forever Has Gone" (1976) 
7" single "When Forever Has Gone / Woman" Philips 6042 186 (1976, Germany)
 A. "When Forever Has Gone" (3:02)
 B. "Woman" (2:30)

7" single "When Forever Has Gone" Philips S 53 804 (1976)
 A. "When Forever Has Gone" (3:02)
 B. "With You" (3:16)

Charts

Certifications

References

External links 

 Démis Roussos – "With You" (1974) on Discogs
 Démis Roussos – "When Forever Has Gone" (1976) on Discogs

1974 songs
1976 singles
Demis Roussos songs
Philips Records singles
Songs written by Brent Mason
Songs written by Stélios Vlavianós
Song recordings produced by Peter Sullivan (record producer)